David Feldman (born 1947 in Dublin) BA, BBS, RDP(I) is a professional philatelist, auctioneer and author. He held his first stamp auction in 1967. Feldman is Honorary Chairman of David Feldman SA, a Geneva-based auction company, through which he attained record prices for some of the world's most famous postage stamps. In 1993, Feldman auctioned the "Bordeaux Cover", which comprised the 1847 1d Orange-red and the 2d Deep Blue Mauritius "Post Office" stamps, which brought 6,175,000 Swiss francs including all commissions, at that time the highest price ever paid for any philatelic item. He also sold the unique 1855 Sweden Treskilling Yellow stamp at auction in 1996, which at the time was the highest price ever paid for a single stamp, eclipsed in 2014 by the sale of the British Guiana 1c magenta.

Early life
His early life was in Dublin, Ireland, where he started a stamp exchange scheme with school classmates at eight years of age.  By 1958 this had become The Shamrock Stamp Club, a mail order sales business promoted by advertising in Mickey Mouse comics. Irish philately was his speciality; the first specialised stamp catalogue, Stamps of Ireland debuted in 1964 and in 1967 he held his first specialised Irish stamp auction, which took place on 10 February in Dublin. When the Handbook of Irish Philately was published in 1968, Feldman presented a copy to the President of Ireland, Éamon de Valera.

By the 1970s, a bullish stamp market led to a great increase in stamp prices; so much so, that Feldman states: "You just could not get enough stamps to sell." During this period he started David Feldman Ltd., became an auctioneer and philatelic author, and  published the DF Newsletter, an Irish philatelic publication along with other specialised books. He also promoted three public stamp exhibitions in Dublin before becoming chairman of Stampa 1972, the first Irish National Stamp Exhibition. David Feldman was a member of the Philatelic Advisory Committee to the Irish Minister for Posts and Telegraphs, from 1975 to 1981, with Robson Lowe and other distinguished philatelists.

Switzerland

Later, having met a Swiss girl who was on a cycling holiday to Ireland, he moved to Switzerland in 1973 and they were married a year later. He has continued to operate as a stamp auctioneer and publisher since then, starting a new auction business and running his first auction there in 1976. Some record prices achieved by David Feldman have been for the Swedish Treskilling Yellow ($2.2 million in 1996), for which his photo appeared in the Guinness Book of World Records, the Mauritius Two Pence Blue ($1.4 million in 1993) stamps and the $1,000,000 for the Alexandria "Blue Boy" Postmaster's Provisional in 1981.

In 1987 Feldman joined together with ex-Christie's President, Géza von Habsburg and others to form Habsburg Feldman SA. Headquartered in Geneva, Switzerland, it held major auctions in paintings, watches, jewellery, art-deco, art nouveau and objets d'arts in centres all over the world.  Ranked as the world's third biggest auctioneer [by volume of sales], the company established world records selling a Patek Philippe watch "Le Calibre" at 5 million Swiss francs and "La Rhubarbe", a piece of Galle glass at 1.5 million Swiss francs in 1988. Feldman also established a new record for a painting by Marc Chagall at US$4.62 million in the same year. In 1990 Feldman left the company over differing views with his associates regarding business strategies.

In 1997, David Feldman was invited to sign the Irish Roll of Distinguished Philatelists for his support and contributions to Irish philately. Feldman auctioned off one of his personal collections in May 2003: The 'Emerald' Collection of Destination Mail of the World contained mail to and from Ireland dating from 1714 to 1913 accumulated over about forty years.

By 2012 Feldman had relinquished all his financial interest in the company to the Frey Group and to current management, and became Honorary chairman.

The Isleworth Mona Lisa
In 2004 Feldman was mandated by Elizabeth Meyer to make research, scientific and physical examinations of her painting which had been known as the Isleworth Mona Lisa. In 2010, he formed, together with Markus Frey and Daniel Kohler, The Mona Lisa Foundation, a non-profit organisation, which absorbed decades of previous research concerning that painting, and initiated new expertises, scientific tests and physical examinations. The work culminated in the publication of 'Mona Lisa – Leonardo's Earlier Version', a 320-page volume published in 2012. The exact status of the painting, however, continues to be debated by art historians.

Family
David Feldman married Fabienne Marquart of Switzerland in 1974, now separated. They have 6 children, four boys followed by two girls (adopted Thai sisters) Amiel David (b. 1979), Joel (b. 1981), Benjamin Boaz (b. 1984), Ruben Gabriel (b. 1986), Nalis (b. 1987), and Kritiya (b. 1989)

Selected publications

References

1947 births
Living people
Stamp dealers
Irish philatelists
Philately of Ireland
Philately of Mauritius
Philatelic auctioneers